The Czech political party ANO 2011 held a leadership election on 2 March 2013. Andrej Babiš was reelected unopposed as the party's leader. He was nominated by most regional organisations, and received 169 votes of 172.

References

ANO 2011 leadership elections
ANO 2011 leadership election
ANO 2011 leadership election
Single-candidate elections
Indirect elections
Elections in Prague
ANO 2011 leadership election
ANO 2011 leadership election